Adrian Kennell Dingle (June 25, 1977 – November 8, 2022) was an American professional football player who was a defensive tackle in the National Football League (NFL). He played five seasons for the San Diego Chargers (2000–2005).

Dingle went to Roberts high school in Holly Hill, South Carolina. He then attended Clemson University, where he broke the single-season sacks record with 10.5 in his senior year. His 23 career sacks ranks third best in school history and is sixth all-time with 45 tackles for loss. Dingle was selected in the fifth round of the 1999 NFL Draft. He missed the entire 1999 season due to injury. He started 15 out of 16 games during the 2003 season, making 37 tackles and six sacks. He finished his career with 78 tackles, 14.5 sacks, two forced fumbles, and one interception. He was the cousin of former Dallas Cowboys defensive end Vontrell Jamison.

Dingle died in Winthrop, Massachusetts, on November 8, 2022, at the age of 45. He is survived by his wife Amy Bell, son Adrian (2018) and daughter Ava (2020).

References

External links 
NFL.com profile
NFL players profile

1977 births
2022 deaths
People from Holly Hill, South Carolina
African-American players of American football
American football defensive ends
Clemson Tigers football players
San Diego Chargers players
21st-century African-American sportspeople
20th-century African-American sportspeople
Ed Block Courage Award recipients